Calliostoma santacruzanum is a species of sea snail, a marine gastropod mollusk in the family Calliostomatidae.

Description
The height of the shell attains 7 mm.

Distribution
This species occurs in the Pacific Ocean off the Galapagos Islands and off Cocos Island, Costa Rica.

References

 Finet, Y., 1995. Marine Molluscs of the Galapagos: Gastropods. A monograph and revision of the families Trochidae, Skeneidae, Turbinidae and Neritidae. First edition ed. L'Informatore Piceno, Italy

External links
 To World Register of Marine Species
 

santacruzanum
Gastropods described in 1970